The Jonathan H. Evans House is located in Platteville, Wisconsin.

History
Jonathan H. Evans was a prominent local politician, businessman, schoolteacher and bank vice president. He was also a leading figure in creating what is now the University of Wisconsin System. The house was listed on the National Register of Historic Places in 1982 and on the State Register of Historic Places in 1989.

References

Houses on the National Register of Historic Places in Wisconsin
National Register of Historic Places in Grant County, Wisconsin
Houses in Grant County, Wisconsin
Italianate architecture in Wisconsin
Queen Anne architecture in Wisconsin
Houses completed in 1870